Area code 626 is a telephone area code that was split from area code 818 in the U.S. state of California, on June 14, 1997. It covers most of the San Gabriel Valley and nearby areas in the northeastern portion of Los Angeles County, California, U.S., including Arcadia, Monrovia, El Monte, most of Pasadena and West Covina.

Prior to October 2021, area code 626 had telephone numbers assigned for the central office code 988. In 2020, 988 was designated nationwide as a dialing code for the National Suicide Prevention Lifeline, which created a conflict for exchanges that permit seven-digit dialing. This area code was therefore scheduled to transition to ten-digit dialing by October 24, 2021.

Cities and communities in the 626 area code

Alhambra (small portion in the 213/323 area code)
Altadena
Arcadia
Avocado Heights
Azusa
Baldwin Park
Bassett
Bradbury
Charter Oak
Citrus
Covina
Duarte
East Pasadena
East San Gabriel
El Monte
Glendora (small portion in the 909 area code) 
Hacienda Heights (small portion in the 562 area code)
Industry (small portions in the 562 and 909 area codes)
Irwindale
La Puente
Mayflower Village
Monrovia
Monterey Park (also in the 213/323 area code)
North El Monte
Pasadena (small portion in the 213/323 area code) 
Rosemead (small portion in the 213/323 area code)
Rowland Heights (also in the 909 area code and small portion in the 562 area code)
San Gabriel
San Marino
Sierra Madre
South El Monte
South Pasadena (also in the 213/323 area code)
South San Gabriel
South San Jose Hills
Temple City
Valinda
Vincent
Walnut (mostly in the 909 area code)
West Covina (small portion in the 909 area code)
West Puente Valley

See also
List of California area codes
List of NANP area codes
North American Numbering Plan

References

External links

626
Los Angeles County, California
San Gabriel Valley
Telecommunications-related introductions in 1997
626